Gdańskie Wydawnictwo Oświatowe Publishing House (GWO) — one of the first privately owned educational publishing houses in Poland prints textbooks for mathematics, Polish language, history, physics, biology, and art.



History
Gdańskie Wydawnictwo Oświatowe was founded in 1991. The first GWO books dealt with mathematics. The series of so-called Zeszyty Gdańskie (Gdansk Workbooks) and Calendars.

Products 

Nowadays, apart from math textbook series entitled Math Plus, GWO prints books for learning Polish language (Amongst Us and Learn thy Language for primary junior high schools, Between the texts for high school), history (Time Travels for all levels), physics (Physics Plus for junior high), biology (Biology with Tangram for high school), art (Freshly Painted for primary school), and a number of teaching support books.

Gdańskie Wydawnictwo Oświatowe has also launched a series of online project: online courses (Matematura.pl, Matlandia, Gimplus), interactive historical maps (History of Poland and Roman Empire), as well as online applications supporting teachers (Test Composer). Moreover, GWO offers selected textbooks, tests, teacher support materials, and magazines as e-books.

Educational projects 

References:

Electronic publishing
Online publishing companies
Mass media in Gdańsk
Publishing companies of Poland
Publishing companies established in 1991
Book publishing companies of Poland
1991 establishments in Poland